The 12447 / 12448 Uttar Pradesh Sampark Kranti Express is a Superfast Express train of the Sampark Kranti Express series belonging to Indian Railways – Northern Railway zone that runs between Manikpur Junction and  in India.

It operates as train number 12447 from Manikpur Junction to Hazrat Nizamuddin and as train number 12448 in the reverse direction, serving the states of Delhi, Madhya Pradesh & Uttar Pradesh.

This train was introduced in the interim budget of 2004 / 05 by the then Railway Minister of India Mr. Nitesh Kumar.

Coaches

Since October 2020 it's running as festival special express with brand new LHB coach and the coach composition is as follows:-
 1 AC First class cum AC second class (HA1)
 2 AC Second tier
 6 AC third tier
 7 Sleeper class
 4 Second sitting (General class)
 1 second sitting cum luggage
 1 power car (HOG)

Service

As the average speed of the train is above , as per Indian Railways rules, its fare includes a Superfast surcharge.

Timing
WEF 22 February 2021 train number 12448
Hazrat Nizamuddin 20:00, Jhansi Junction 01:20-01:30, Manikpur 07:30

WEF 23 February 2021 train number 12447
Manikpur 18:25, Jhansi Junction 23:25-23:30, Hazrat Nizamuddin 05:22

Traction

It is hauled by a Ghaziabad-based WAP-5 or Tughlakabad-based WAP-7 locomotive from end to end.

Routeing

Following are the stoppages of this train:-

 Chitrakoot Dham Karwi
 
 Banda
 
 Kulpahar
 
 Mauranipur

Rake sharing
No rake sharing. 2 dedicated rakes.

See also 

 Manikpur Junction railway station
 Hazrat Nizamuddin railway station
 Khajuraho–Hazrat Nizamuddin Uttar Pradesh Sampark Kranti Express

References 

 http://www.news18.com/videos/uttar-pradesh/fire-in-sampark-kranti-express-engine-near-jhansi-creates-panic-453491.html
 http://pib.nic.in/newsite/erelease.aspx?relid=4151

External links

Transport in Delhi
Sampark Kranti Express trains
Rail transport in Delhi
Rail transport in Madhya Pradesh
Rail transport in Uttar Pradesh
Railway services introduced in 2005